The 1950–51 NCAA men's basketball season began in December 1950, progressed through the regular season and conference tournaments, and concluded with the 1951 NCAA basketball tournament championship game on March 27, 1951, at Williams Arena in Minneapolis, Minnesota. The Kentucky Wildcats won their second NCAA national championship with a 68–58 victory over the Kansas State Wildcats.

Season headlines 

 The United Press (later United Press International) Coaches Poll made its debut.
 After a two-season hiatus during which its teams competed as non-major programs, the Border Conference resumed basketball competition as a major conference.
 During January and February 1951, the CCNY point-shaving scandal is revealed. Over the next few months, it results in the arrests of 32 players from seven schools for point shaving in 86 games between 1947 and 1950.
 The NCAA tournament expanded for the first time, from eight to 16 teams.

Season outlook

Pre-season polls 

The Top 20 from the UP Coaches Poll during the pre-season.

Conference membership changes

Regular season

Conference winners and tournaments

Informal championships

Statistical leaders

Post-season tournaments

NCAA tournament

Semifinals & finals 

 Third Place – Illinois 61, Oklahoma A&M 46

National Invitation tournament

Semifinals & finals 

 Third Place – St. John's 70, Seton Hall 68

Awards

Consensus All-American teams

Major player of the year awards 

 Helms Player of the Year: Dick Groat, Duke
 Sporting News Player of the Year: Sherman White, Long Island

Other major awards 

 NIT/Haggerty Award (Top player in New York City metro area): John Azary, Columbia

Coaching changes 
A number of teams changed coaches during the season and after it ended.

References